Maren Morris: Reimagined is an extended play (EP) by American country artist Maren Morris. It was released on May 31, 2019, via Sony Music Entertainment and contained three tracks all produced by Dave Cobb. The project was a re–working of Morris's most popular singles cut in an acoustic style. It premiered exclusively through Apple Music with an accompanying video that highlighted the recording process.

Background, content and release
Maren Morris reached her breakthrough with songs that were grounded in the genre of country music, but also fused elements of R&B, pop and rock. The balance helped bring Morris crossover success with songs like "The Middle" and "The Bones". Morris collaborated in 2019 with producer Dave Cobb to remake her material in an acoustic fashion. "I think the mark of a good song is you can rearrange it up and it still is a very defining song. Dave you know, his production is so rootsy and very soulful and Americana and he just understands that sound so intensely," she explained. Maren Morris: Reimagined was recorded in Nashville, Tennessee at RCA Studio B.

Maren Morris: Reimagined contained a total of three songs. All three songs were previously re–recorded and had been commercially–successful singles for Morris in her career: "Girl", "The Bones" and "The Middle". Taste of Country described the tracks in detail in their description of the EP: "'Girl' is infused with a more roots sound, while 'The Middle' still has a pop vibe as the melody is created with piano, bass and a cajon beatbox. The integrity of 'The Bones' remains intact, with acoustic guitar accompanying Morris as she soulfully sings the lyrics." The EP was released through Apple Music on May 31, 2019. It was issued via Sony Music Nashville with a companion video. The film showed clips of the recording process, with excerpts of Cobb and Morris in the studio.

Track listing

Release history

References

2019 EPs
Albums produced by Dave Cobb
Maren Morris EPs
Sony Music EPs